The Kömürhan Bridge, or with its other name, İsmet Paşa Bridge, is a box-girder bridge that carries the Elazığ-Malatya highway  over the Euphrates River in eastern Turkey. It was constructed using the balanced cantilever technique.

The bridge was constructed to replace a 100 m long concrete arch bridge built by the Swedish company Nydqvist & Holm AB, costs 110 million Turkish lira as the money of that time, and opened on 5 October 1932, which was flooded with the completion of the Karakaya Dam. The new bridge was built by the STFA Group between 23 February 1983 and 8 April 1986.

Kömürhan Bridge is between Malatya Province and Elazığ Province. The tender, that is for building a new bridge that is 600 m length at same place, completed in 2013.

It features in the "50 works in 50 years" list of significant building projects in Turkey published by the Chamber of Civil Engineers in Turkey.

References 

Road bridges in Turkey
Bridges over the Euphrates River
Bridges completed in 1986
Buildings and structures in Elazığ Province
Cantilever bridges
Crossings of the Euphrates